The Regional Economics Applications Laboratory (REAL) at the University of Illinois at Urbana-Champaign is a regional science research center for advanced graduate students in the fields of economics, geography, urban and regional planning, computer science and mathematics. Professor Geoffrey J.D. Hewings, one of its founders, served as its director until 2016. Professor Sandy Dall'erba has been its director since 2016.

Main goal
Created in 1989 by Philip Israilevich and Geoffrey J.D. Hewings, the Regional Economics Applications Laboratory (REAL) at the University of Illinois at Urbana-Champaign started as a cooperative venture between the Federal Reserve Bank of Chicago and the University of Illinois.

While analyses of economies at the national level have long been prominent in the field of economics, increasing fragmentation of the production process in conjunction with increasing regional specialization due to the reduction of transportation costs obliges us to consider economies from a sub-national or even local perspective. Further, the last decade has seen remarkable progress in techniques for spatial economic analysis – the measurement and interpretation of economic activity across geographies as small as counties to units as extensive as individual countries.

Based on these approaches and techniques, REAL’s mission is to provide timely, high quality analytical economic information for a variety of uses such as public policy decision making by public sector agencies and for strategic marketing in the private sector. REAL's capabilities revolve around comprehensive state and metropolitan models that integrate econometric and input-output analysis to provide for both impact and forecasting analyses. Current activities focus on interstate trade, forecasts for the Chicago, Illinois and other Midwest economies, housing market analysis and forecasts, demographic-economic modeling (especially the role of aging and immigration) and the development of alternative computable general equilibrium models created on the same data base.

Research at REAL always attempts to provide a range of exposure to new curricula materials, methods of conducting interdisciplinary and international collaborative research and guidance in the preparation of material for dissemination in the public policy arena.  The latter component is extremely important and undervalued, yet academic research over the next decade is likely to be more project-driven with funding from stakeholders whose interest lie in the policy arena and less in the academic or scholarly content.  Hence, it is important that scholars learn, at an early stage in their career, how to balance the needs of client-based research with demands imposed on them by the academy for demonstrating high levels of scholarly achievement.

REAL was created to operate like a science laboratory - with students and faculty together in one space, promoting interaction and collaboration.  A weekly seminar series provides students with many opportunities to present their research and an active Discussion Paper series on the web ensures wide dissemination for research.  REAL is supported by external grants and contracts, many of which have been developed with agencies in Brazil, Chile, Colombia, Indonesia, Japan, Korea, and Austria.  Most of the research has successfully served two markets - academic journals and public policy.

Student involvement
Since its inception, REAL has provided at least two years (and usually more) support for 38 doctoral students from agricultural economics, economics, geography and urban and regional planning, welcomed 8 "bolsa sandwiche" PhD students from Brazil who spent one year at REAL working on their doctoral dissertations and hosted over 100 international visitors (visiting students, visiting scholars and visiting professors) who stayed three months or more. Several experiences of foreign scholars coming informally to the University of Illinois at Urbana-Champaign demonstrated that a period of one or two semesters resulted in a major contribution to the thesis of these young researchers, as well as to their personal enhancement.  At any one time, from 15 to 30 visitors and students will be in residence. An updated list of past and current members is available from the following link: http://www.real.uiuc.edu/

Foreign visitors appreciate more especially the exposure to the challenges, issues and opportunities in another country because it provides them an important perspective that cannot be “taught” effectively by distance learning. Residence in another country, coupled with engagement with other students and faculty involved in their work provide them with an invaluable learning opportunity. In addition, the mass of students and the profound respect of REAL’s director for the various techniques of regional science allow foreign visitors to build quickly partnerships for their work and receive sound feedback.

Over the years, several colleagues, such as Rodney Jensen (Australia), Michael Sonis (Israel), Eduardo Haddad (Brazil), Joaquim Guilhoto (Brazil), Carlos Azzoni (Brazil), Miguel Marquez (Spain), Julian Ramajo (Spain) and Nikolaos Kalyviotis (Greece) have become regular visitors.  The collaboration with Sonis has yielded over 75 publications (including two edited monographs and 24 book chapters). About one third of REAL's alumni are working in academia, another third in local, state and international agencies and the remaining third in the private sector.

The sister organization of REAL is EU-REAL , the European Union – Regional Economics Applications Laboratory. EU-REAL is a research net in regional science integrated by European scholars tied to REAL. Their goal is to foment the cooperation of their different members, establish permanent linkage among the participant researchers, and promote the development of different investigation lines in regional science.

Sources
http://www.real.uiuc.edu/
http://www.real.uiuc.edu/news/marathon01.pdf 
http://eco.unex.es/eureal/

Economic research institutes
Research institutes established in 1989
University of Illinois Urbana-Champaign centers and institutes